Žimutice is a municipality and village in České Budějovice District in the South Bohemian Region of the Czech Republic. It has about 600 inhabitants.

Administrative parts
Villages of Hrušov, Krakovčice, Pořežany, Smilovice, Sobětice, Třitim and Tuchonice are administrative parts of Žimutice. Smilovice and Pořežany, Třitim and Tuchonice form two exclaves of the municipal territory.

Notable people
Šimon Bárta (1864–1940), Bishop of České Budějovice

References

Villages in České Budějovice District